Manulea nigrocollare is a moth of the family Erebidae. It is found in Russia (Magadan Oblast, Maymandzhin Range, Upper Kolyma).

References

Moths described in 1990
Lithosiina